Hosie is a surname. Notable people with the surname include:

Alexander Hosie (1890–1957), English cricketer
Andrew Hosie, Scottish footballer
Paul Hosie (born 1967), Australian cave diver
Robert Hosie, Scottish footballer
Stewart Hosie (born 1963), Scottish politician